J. H. Smith may refer to:

J. H. Smith (Mayor of Everett), American politician 
J. Harold Smith (1910–2001), American Southern Baptist
J. Hubert Smith, American politician from Arizona
Jeffrey H. Smith, American mathematician
Joseph Henry Smith (born 1945), Ghanaian soldier and politician
James H. Smith (physicist), American physicist, see David H. Frisch and 1963 in the United States

See also
John H. Smith (disambiguation)
List of people with surname Smith